Ilyina Gora is a rural locality (a village) in Voskresenskoye Rural Settlement, Cherepovetsky District, Vologda Oblast, Russia. The population was 17 as of 2002.

Geography 
Popovskoye is the nearest rural locality.

References 

Rural localities in Cherepovetsky District